M. Vaithianathan is an Indian politician and a current member of the Puducherry Legislative Assembly from the Lawspet constituency. He had earlier won that constituency in an All India N.R. Congress ticket in the 2011 Puducherry Assembly election, polling 10189 votes, defeating V. P. Sivakolundhu of Congress with a margin of 5432 votes. During the 2016 assembly election however, he was denied a ticket from AINRC. He then contested independently but lost to V. P. Sivakolundhu placing himself second in the constituency on poll count. Just prior to the 2021 Puducherry assembly election Vaithianathan joined the Congress party and contested from Lawspet constituency again, this time defeating the Puducherry state BJP president, V. Saminathan by a margin of 5701 votes.

References 

Year of birth missing (living people)
Living people
People from Pondicherry
Puducherry MLAs 2011–2016
All India NR Congress politicians
Indian National Congress politicians from Puducherry
Puducherry MLAs 2021–2026